Nimai Chandra Saha (born 29 March 1960) is an Indian academic and the current vice-chancellor of the University of Burdwan, India.

Career 
Saha passed M.Sc. in Zoology from University of Kalyani in 1982. He completed D.Sc. from Raiganj University. Saha became the reader of Presidency College, Kolkata. He served as Principal in number of colleges in West Bengal. He became the Directorate of Public Instruction under the Govt. of West Bengal in 2015. Saha was appointed as Vice Chancellor of the University of Burdwan on 1 November 2016.

References 

1960 births
Living people
University of Kalyani alumni
People from Nadia district
West Bengal academics